The women's 400 metres event at the 1985 Summer Universiade was held at the Kobe Universiade Memorial Stadium in Kobe on 30 and 31 August.

Medalists

Results

Heats
Held on 30 August

Semifinals
Held on 31 August

Final
Held on 31 August

References

Athletics at the 1985 Summer Universiade
1985